Area code 320 is the telephone numbering plan code covering most of central Minnesota, excluding the Twin Cities metro. It was the fourth Minnesota area code, and the first new one in the state in 42 years. It was created in 1996 by carving out of the western part of area code 612, which originally stretched border-to-border from Wisconsin through the Twin Cities to South Dakota. 

It had been obvious for some time that 612 would need to be split due to the Twin Cities' rapid growth. However, the split was hastened by the proliferation of cell phones, pagers, fax machines and dial-up Internet access. The Twin Cities region retained 612, with St. Cloud, Alexandria, and Willmar switching to 320. 

More recently, the 612 area shrank to include only Minneapolis and a few inner suburbs. 320 now borders every Minnesota area code except 612. Area code 651 split from 612 in 1998. The 651 area borders Wisconsin, while area codes 763 and 952 were split from 612 in 2000. Area code 218 borders 320 to the north, and area code 507 covers southern Minnesota.

Cities and communities in the 320

Albany
Alexandria
Annandale
Appleton
Askov
Atwater
Avon
Benson
Bird Island
Biscay
Braham
Browns Valley
Browerville
Brownton
Buffalo Lake
Clara City
Clarissa
Clarkfield
Clear Lake
Clearwater
Cokato
Cold Spring
Collegeville
Danube
Dassel
Dawson
Eden Valley
Farwell
Foley
Garrison
Glencoe
Glenwood
Granite Falls
Hector
Hinckley
Holdingford
Howard Lake
Hutchinson
Isle
Kimball
Lester Prairie
Litchfield
Little Falls
Long Beach
Long Prairie
Lowry
Madison
Maple Lake
Melrose
Milaca
Montevideo
Mora
Morris
New London
Ogilvie
Olivia
Onamia
Ortonville
Osakis
Paynesville
Pierz
Pine City
Randall
Renville
Rice
Richmond
Rock Creek
Rockville
Royalton
Rush City
Sacred Heart
St. Augusta
St. Cloud
St. Joseph
Sandstone
Sartell
Sauk Centre
Sauk Rapids
Spicer
Starbuck
Stewart
Upsala
Waite Park
Watkins
Wheaton
Willmar
Winsted

See also
 List of North American area codes

External links
NANPA: Minnesota area code map
List of exchanges from AreaCodeDownload.com, 320 Area Code

1996 establishments in Minnesota
Telecommunications-related introductions in 1996
320
320